David W. Horohov is an American veterinary scientist and the current William Robert Mills Chair in Equine Infectious Diseases at University of Kentucky.

References

Year of birth missing (living people)
Living people
University of Kentucky faculty
American veterinarians
Male veterinarians